Record TV Europa is a subsidiary of the Rede Record, a Brazilian television network. It produces and distributes Record TV programming from Brazil in Portugal and Europe.

In Portugal, it distributes three channels. Along with CMTV, Record TV also showed interest in distributing a free-to-air channel in the Portuguese Digital Terrestrial Television platform.

Channels
Record TV Europa general entertainment and news
Record HD HD simulcast of Record Europa
Record TV News mostly a simulcast of Record News in Brazil

References